Alan Johnson (February 18, 1937 – July 7, 2018) was a three-time Emmy Award-winning  American choreographer, best known for his work on Mel Brooks films and for restaging Jerome Robbins' original choreography in live productions of West Side Story in the United States and internationally. Johnson was linked to West Side Story since making his Broadway debut in the show in 1957.

He brought the West Side Story dance style into the mainstream when he choreographed several GAP clothing commercials in 2000. This commercial earned him an American Choreography award. Along with the GAP/WestSide advertisements, Johnson also choreographed commercials for Dubonnet and Freixenet Champagne.

Relationship with Mel Brooks
Johnson choreographed musical numbers in several Brooks films, such as the infamous "Springtime for Hitler" number in The Producers, the "Spanish Inquisition" dance number from the film, History of the World, Part I and "Puttin' On the Ritz" in Young Frankenstein. Johnson also directed Brooks in the 1983 film To Be or Not to Be.

Filmography

As choreographer
Dracula: Dead and Loving It (1995)
History of the World, Part I (1981)
The World's Greatest Lover (1977)
Cos (1976) TV Series
The Adventure of Sherlock Holmes' Smarter Brother (1975)
Young Frankenstein (1974)
Blazing Saddles (1974)
The Producers (1968)

As director
To Be or Not to Be (1983)
Solarbabies (1986)

References

External links
 
 

1937 births
2018 deaths
Primetime Emmy Award winners
American choreographers
Film choreographers
People from Ridley Park, Pennsylvania